Apgar may refer to:

Apgar (surname), a surname
Apgar score, method to quickly and summarily assess the health of newborn children immediately after childbirth
Virginia Apgar, obstetrician, deviser of the Apgar score
Apgar Village, a small village in Glacier National Park near West Glacier, Montana